Louise Burfitt-Dons,  (née Byres; born 22 October 1953) is a British novelist, humanitarian, and  former Conservative candidate.

Burfitt-Dons is best known for her anti-bullying work as the founder of the charity Act Against Bullying and co-founder of Kindness Day UK.

Early years and family
Louise Olivian Byres was born to Olive and Ian Byres in a small desert hospital at Magwa, in the Burgan district just south of Kuwait City. Her father worked for Kuwait Oil Company and her mother ran a kindergarten. She had an elder brother, Laurence. She attended the Anglo-American School in Kuwait, and later The Hertfordshire and Essex High School and the Ashford School for Girls in Kent. Burfitt-Dons' father died of cancer when she was 26. During his illness she obtained a liquor licence and took over the running of The White Horse in East Bergholt so she could care for him.

Burfitt-Dons has two daughters, Brooke Burfitt and Arabella (b. 1992), by her pilot husband Donald Burfitt-Dons, a New Zealander whom she met and married in London in 1982 while he was on an overseas basing with Qantas. The couple lived in Australia between 1982 and 1993 where Louise worked as an actress and wrote plays for the Sydney stage. She co-starred in a dinner theatre show with Andrew Harwood in 1988.   She lives in Chiswick, London.

Social commentary
Louise has appeared on Sky News, Good Morning America, Channel Four News, ITV News London, ITN, BBC Breakfast and Talk Radio Europe, BBC Surrey and BBC Sussex, BBC Oxford, LBC, PM, Talkradio The World Tonight. She has written on social affairs and political issues for a range of blogs including Conservative Home and  Conservative Way Forward. She is a regular news reviewer on the Ian Collins show Roundtable on LBC.

Boosting Britain
In 2012, after visiting a range of different businesses, she set up an online initiative named 'Boosting Britain' to encourage and promote new ideas and companies which were helping Britain. It covered infrastructure, defence industry, education, as well as motivational factors. She has suggested more honorary titles for engineers would help to bolster their image and help with the skills shortage As of 2017, the website was unregistered and not connecting.

Campaigning
Since setting up Act Against Bullying, Burfitt-Dons has been outspoken on the ill-effects of tribalism in society as a speaker and writer. She has advocated that tribalism is on the increase and has been taking effect in all forms of modern society leading to social unrest. Feeling the need to express what the public was confiding in her she designed a range of campaigns to promote human dignity and individuality in modern society.

She designed the "Cool to Be Kind" Campaign in 2000; two years later she founded the National Decency Campaign in 2002. and, in 2006, the "Grade Not Degrade" campaign. The Scotsman quoted her as suggesting Celebrity Big Brother was legitimising the growing trend of bullying behaviour in classrooms around the country. She spoke at the Conservative Women's Organisation Forum  at the House of Commons on cyber bullying claiming that today "children have to be as savvy as celebrities but without the pr support". In response to the growing trend of internet abuse she designed the CyberKind Campaign, which was launched on Remembrance Day (11 November) 2009.

Burfitt-Dons founded the UK Kindness Movement and co-founder of Kindness Day UK. She appeared on BBC Breakfast on the first Kindness Day UK on 13 November 2010 alongside Kathy Lette who claimed that English people were condescending and unfriendly.  In 2007 she began campaigning on global warming and has said that "climate change may be the ultimate issue that unites us all".

Awards
In 2006 she was nominated as an Angel Hero for The My Hero Project. In May 2009 she was invited to become a Fellow of the Royal Society of Arts in recognition of her work with children as well as to acknowledge her efforts as a campaigner and speaker on humanitarian and environmental issues.

Global warming
Burfitt-Dons co-founded the Global Warming Alliance which was set up in January 2006 to find solutions to the crisis. On 2 December 2008, she launched the Global Warming Hotspot  channel on YouTube. She spearheaded the international Hot Women Campaign, which encouraged women to become more active in climate change issues and reduce carbon emissions and significantly raised awareness of the differences between male and female thinking on the issues. The Scotsman quoted Burfitt-Dons' claims that "the relentless rise in CO2 emissions is incrementally raising planetary temperatures, increasing water vapour in the atmosphere with a commensurate rise in rainfall, and ever stronger wind patterns randomly occurring across the globe."

Feminism
Burfitt-Dons got involved with women's issues because of her charity work as a motivational speaker and mentor. In October 2009 she was part of the freshers feminist debate at Cambridge University with Cosmopolitan Magazine editor Louise Court and Edwina Currie. Burfitt-Dons set up the Royal Society of Arts' Women's Speakers' Network whose mission is to "raise women's profile in society by greater involvement in public speaking". She chaired the launch event at the Institution of Mechanical Engineers on 9 November 2010 in a public debate entitled "The Great Female Debate: Do Women Speak Too much or too little?" She believes that some feminist groups have hijacked and radicalised the equality movement and has catalysed a debate around feminism calling on more gender realism via her blog The Common Sense Feminist. Her work on feminism includes the book Moderating Feminism:The Past the Now and What Comes Next (2016).

Politics
In September 2014, she was selected to fight the 2015 General Election for the Conservative Party in Nottingham North. She clashed with the incumbent MP Graham Allen over his criticism of small businesses in Nottingham North. She has challenged Nottingham City Council over its Workplace Parking Levy policy as "short-term thinking" at its worst, and suggested that it was a political decision rather than an economic one.  Nottingham was the first City Council to introduce a Workplace Parking Levy in the UK.

Novelist and screenwriter
Her book Our Man in Kuwait which features Ian Fleming is based on her early life experiences in Kuwait in 1960 leading up to Operation Vantage.

Burfitt-Dons has written TV movies for Lifetime, including Maternal Secrets, Kidnapped to the Island, The Ex Next Door, and Christmas at the Castle.

Publications, novels, and plays
Our Man in Kuwait
The Secret War (July 2021)
The Killing of the Cherrywood MP (February 2020)
The Missing Activist (August 2018)
Moderating Feminism (August 2016)
Act Against Bullying (August 2002) 
Painkillers (June 2001) 
Valentine Card (June 2001) 
The Counsellor (October 2000)
A Christmas Riddle (June 2000) 
How to Catch a Man (September 1991)

References

External links

Louise Burfitt-Dons
The Common Sense Feminist

1953 births
Living people
Green thinkers
British environmentalists
British women environmentalists
British humanitarians
English feminist writers
Conservative Party (UK) parliamentary candidates
Sustainability advocates
English motivational speakers
People educated at The Hertfordshire and Essex High School
People educated at Ashford School
Anti-bullying activists
British feminists
English feminists
Writers from London
English screenwriters
English female screenwriters
People from Chiswick
Academics and writers on bullying
British women activists
English activists
English women activists
British activists
Female critics of feminism
British women bloggers
Crime Writers' Association
English women novelists
English thriller writers
English spy fiction writers
English crime fiction writers
Women thriller writers
21st-century English writers
21st-century English women writers
English bloggers
21st-century British screenwriters